Elio Zagato (27 February 192114 September 2009) was an Italian automobile designer.

Like his brother Gianni Zagato (born 1929), Elio Zagato joined his father Ugo Zagato's design firm Zagato in Milan and, upon the father's death in 1968, took over its management.

He also raced cars and was one of the founders of Scuderia Ambrosiana of Milan.  Races he won include Targa Florio and five GT series, as well as Coppa Inter-Europa in 1954, the Dolomites Gold Cup Race and the Berlin Avus Cup in 1955.

His son Andrea Zagato is as of 2009 in charge of the family business, jointly with his wife Marella Rivolta-Zagato, daughter to Piero Rivolta of the carmaker Iso Automoveicoli S.p.A.

His autobiography Storie di corse e non solo was published in 2002.

References

External links
 Elio Zagato - Daily Telegraph obituary

Italian automobile designers
Italian racing drivers
Sportspeople from Milan
1921 births
2009 deaths
Alfa Romeo people
Italian motorsport people
Formula One team owners